The midget flowerpecker (Dicaeum aeneum) is a species of bird in the family Dicaeidae. It is found in the Solomon Islands archipelago. Its natural habitats are subtropical or tropical moist lowland forest, subtropical or tropical mangrove forest, and subtropical or tropical moist montane forest.

References

External links
Image and Classification at Animal Diversity Web

midget flowerpecker
Endemic birds of the Solomon Islands
midget flowerpecker
Taxonomy articles created by Polbot